About the Blues is an album by Julie London that was released in 1957. The album includes two songs written by Bobby Troup, her husband. Miles Davis recorded a version of one of them, "The Meaning of the Blues". The eighteen-piece band was arranged by Russell Garcia.

Track listing

Bonus tracks on the CD release

Selected personnel
Julie London - vocals
Willie Smith - alto saxophone
Maynard Ferguson - trumpet
Barney Kessel - guitar
Shelly Manne - drums
Russ Garcia - arranger, conductor

References

1957 albums
Julie London albums
Liberty Records albums
Albums produced by Bobby Troup
Albums recorded at Radio Recorders